American singer, songwriter, and actress Miley Cyrus has appeared in music videos, films, television series and video games. From 2006 to 2011, Cyrus starred in the television series Hannah Montana as Miley Stewart and her alter ego, Hannah Montana. In 2009, Cyrus starred in the feature film Hannah Montana: The Movie, whose soundtrack included her lead single "The Climb". Her other films included voicing the role of Penny in the animated film Bolt in 2008, The Last Song with Liam Hemsworth in 2010, and LOL with Demi Moore in 2012. Her song "When I Look at You" was part of The Last Song soundtrack with the music video directed by the film's producer, Adam Shankman. She has released 39 music videos and appeared on 12 music videos.

In 2007, Cyrus released her first official music video for the second single "Start All Over" of her debut album Meet Miley Cyrus, the second disc of the dual album Hannah Montana 2: Meet Miley Cyrus. Her second music video for "7 Things", was the lead single from her second studio album Breakout. She then released music videos for her songs "Fly on the Wall" (2008), and "Party in the U.S.A." (2009), which won the MuchMusic Video Award for Best International Artist Video.

In 2010, to transition Cyrus away from the "good-girl" image she had developed through Hannah Montana, she released music videos for the singles "Can't Be Tamed" and "Who Owns My Heart" from her third studio album Can't Be Tamed. Both videos were directed by Robert Hales. She went on to cover the song "You're Gonna Make Me Lonesome When You Go" for the tribute album Chimes of Freedom and released a music video with Johnzo West. In 2013, Cyrus released the music videos "We Can't Stop", "Wrecking Ball", and "Adore You" from her fourth studio album Bangerz. The music video for "Wrecking Ball" won the 2014 MTV Video Music Award for Video of the Year.

Cyrus has made guest appearances in other artists' music videos including Metro Station's "Seventeen Forever" in 2009, Rock Mafia's "The Big Bang" in 2010, Borgore's "Decisions" in 2012, and Future's "Real and True" and will.i.am's "Feelin' Myself" in 2013.  She was also both featured as a vocalist and appeared in the videos for "Ashtrays and Heartbreaks" by Snoop Dogg and "23" by Mike Will Made It in 2013.

Music videos

Guest appearances

Commercials

Filmography

Herself

Film

Television

Web

Video games

References

External links
 

Videography
Videographies of American artists
Actress filmographies
American filmographies